The International Federation of Sports Chiropractic ( or FICS)  is an international organization which promotes sports chiropractic around the world. It is composed of national sports chiropractic councils, or the national associations, from many countries such as Australia, Canada, Chile, Japan, Mexico, Spain, Turkey, United States, and the United Kingdom. FICS is the leaders in Sports Chiropractic and provide equitable access to sports chiropractic care, education, mentoring and research to all athletes and sports chiropractors regionally, nationally and internationally.

Issues International Credential
The International Certificate in Sports Chiropractic (ICSC) is the highly-acclaimed and exclusive International Certificate in Sports Chiropractic (ICSC). The ICSC is a post-graduate professional qualification in sports chiropractic. Depending on the laws of the jurisdiction in which the Doctor practices (ICSC) is a requirement for a chiropractor to participate as a FICS sports chiropractor at an international event. Sports Chiropractors must complete their ICSC before being selected to provide care at Sporting Federation Games.

Awards and honors
The FICS Executive Board bestows various awards upon individuals who have, in their opinion made considerable contributions to the professional specialty of sports chiropractic. These have included, the "Sports Chiropractor of the Year"; and the "Highest Award that can be bestowed upon a sports Chiropractor, Internationally, the FICS' Gold Medal. In 2011 at the World Chiropractic Congress, in Rio de Janeiro, they awarded the "FICS' Founder's Award" to Dr. Stephen Press, their founder and 1st President.

FICS Doctors working Pro Bono
FICS has promoted the participation of chiropractors in sports medicine teams, and has organized chiropractors to provide treatment at many national and international sporting events including the winter and summer Olympics. It has held Congresses in Mexico City, Rome, New Jersey, Wash. DC, Australia, Iowa, Montreal, and Tokyo; and sent delegations to Moscow, Africa, and Caracas.

Formation and Organization
FICS was formed in 1987, and has its headquarters in the Maison du Sport Internationale in Lausanne, Switzerland. It also maintains an administrative office in Canberra, Australia.

The Presidents of FICS are:

Recognition
ICSC - International Certificate in Sports Chiropractic 
ICSSPE - FICS is a member of the Associations' Board of the International Council of Sport Science and Physical Education
SportAccord - Associate member of international sports accrediting agency SportAccord (the former GAISF). 
UNESCO - Affiliate of the United Nations Educational, Scientific and Cultural Organization.
IWGA International World Games Association, in contract with FICS to provide all medical services at World Games.

Events
FICS Chiropractors have provided treatment at events including:
2020 - Service Agreements with 24 International Sporting Federations

 African Championships in Athletics (1988)
 African Championships in Athletics (1990)
 All-Africa Games (1991)
 World Track and Field Championships (1991)
 XVIth Winter Olympic Games  (1992)
 All-Africa Games (1999)
 Gunston 500 International Surfing Competition (1998)
 Ontario Games (2000)
 Maritime Life Olympic Trials (2000)
 Canadian Paralympic Trials (2000)
 World Surfing Games (2000)
 Summer Olympics (2000)
 Mediterranean Games (2001)
 XIXth Central American and Caribbean Games (2002)
 Winter Olympics (2002)
 World Games (2005)
 Summer Olympics (2008)
 World Games (2009)
 PanAm Games (2011)
 World Games (2013)
 World Games (2017)
 World Urban Games / GAISF games(2019)
 CSIT Games 2019 (2019)

References

External links

 International Federation of Sports Chiropractic (FICS)

Sports chiropractic
Chiropractic organizations
Chiro
Ch